Frank Hanna may refer to:
 Frank Hanna (politician) (1914–1987), Irish politician
 Frank Hanna III (born 1960s), American entrepreneur and merchant banker
 Frank Hanna (footballer, born 1893) (1893–1967), Australian rules footballer for the Carlton Football Club
 Frank Hanna (footballer, born 1924) (1924–2010), Australian rules footballer for the Melbourne Football Club

See also
 Frank Hannah (born 1971), Scottish filmmaker